Inquisitor sterrha, commonly known as the formidable turrid, is a species of sea snail, a marine gastropod mollusc in the family Pseudomelatomidae.

Description
The length of this species is 39 mm, its diameter13 mm.

The body whorl contains in one specimen fourteen ribs, in another specimen seventeen ribs.

Distribution
This marine species occurs in the Central Indo-West Pacific; the Gulf of Carpentaria, off Queensland, Australia; off the Philippines; southern Indonesia and southern Papua New Guinea.

References

 Watson, R.B. 1881. Mollusca of "H.M.S. Challenger" expedition. Parts VIII-X. Pleurotomidae. Journal of the Linnean Society of London, Zoology 15: 388–475
 Smith, E.A. 1884. Mollusca. pp. 34–116, 487–508, 657–659, pls 4–7. In, Report on the Zoological Collections made in the Indo-Pacific Ocean during the voyage of the H.M.S. 'Alert ' 1881-2. London : British Museum Trustees, printed by Taylor & Francis. 
 Schepman, M.M. 1913. Toxoglossa. pp. 384–396 in Weber, M. & de Beaufort, L.F. (eds). The Prosobranchia, Pulmonata and Opisthobranchia Tectibranchiata, Tribe Bullomorpha, of the Siboga Expedition. Monograph 49. Siboga Expeditie 32(2)
 Rippingale, O.H. & McMichael, D.F. 1961. Queensland and Great Barrier Reef Shells. Brisbane : Jacaranda Press 210 pp.
 Powell, A.W.B. 1968. The Turrid shellfish of Australian waters. Australian Natural History 1 16: 1–6
 Coleman, N. 1975. What Shell is That? Sydney : Lansdowne Press 298 pp. 
 Wells, F.E. 1994. A revision of the Recent Australian species of the turrid genera Inquisitor and Ptychobela. Journal of the Malacological Society of Australasia 15: 71–102 
 Wilson, B. 1994. Australian Marine Shells. Prosobranch Gastropods. Kallaroo, WA : Odyssey Publishing Vol. 2 370 pp.

External links
 

sterrha
Gastropods described in 1881